Frances Whitmore (1666–1695) was a British courtier.
Frances was one of the Hampton Court Beauties painted by Sir Godfrey Kneller for Queen Mary II.
She was styled Dame Frances Myddelton.

Family
Her father was Sir Thomas Whitmore, (son of Sir Thomas Whitmore, 1st Baronet), and her mother was Hon. Frances Brooke (1640–1690).

She married Sir Richard Myddelton, 3rd Baronet (1655–1716) in c.1686.
They had three children:
 Frances Myddelton (d.1693),
 Mary Myddelton (1688–1747),
 Sir William Myddelton, 4th Baronet (1694–1718).

Other
As one of the Hampton Court Beauties, Frances Myddelton (Nee Whitmore) was known as Lady Myddelton, coincidentally, her husband's aunt is the Mrs Myddelton of the Windsor Beauties and her own mother is Lady Whitmore of the Windsor Beauties.

References

External links

17th-century English people
1666 births
1695 deaths
Wives of baronets